Ohaldres (Spanish hojaldres) are Filipino puff pastries originating from the Visayas Islands. They are very similar to utap, and are sometimes considered a type of utap, but they have a denser texture and are sliced thicker.

See also
 Apas (biscuit)
 Palmier

References

Puff pastry
Philippine pastries